Mudzaffar Shah may refer to:
 Mudzaffar Shah I of Kedah
 Mudzaffar Shah II of Kedah